Erbessa euryzona is a moth of the family Notodontidae first described by Louis Beethoven Prout in 1922. It is found in Bolivia.

References

Moths described in 1922
Notodontidae of South America